The Menasco Pirate series were four-cylinder, air-cooled, in-line, inverted aero-engines, built by the Menasco Motors Company of Burbank, California, for use in light general and sport aircraft during the 1930s and 1940s. The Menasco engines came in both normally aspirated and supercharged forms, with the supercharged models exhibiting superior performance at higher altitudes, with a relatively small increase in dimensions and weight. The supercharged models had the S suffix added to their designation to show supercharging.

Variants
Menasco A-4 Pirate (also listed as Menasco 4A)
90 hp.
Menasco B-4 Pirate
95 hp.
Menasco C-4 Pirate (Military designation L-365)
125 hp. Compression ratio 5.8: 1, dry weight 300 lb
Menasco Pirate C-4S
Super-charged 150 hp.
Menasco D-4 Pirate
125 hp, compression ratio 5.5:1, dry weight 311 lb
Menasco D-4-87 Super Pirate
134 hp,Compression ratio 6:1, dry weight 310 lb
Menasco L-365-1 military designation for the C4-4LA
Menasco L-365-3 similar to -1 but changes to cylinder heads, lubrication and carburettor

Applications
Argonaut Pirate
Aeroneer 1-B
Great Lakes 2T-1MS
de Havilland Canada DH.82C Menasco Moth (Canada, 136 built)
Fairchild 22 C7B
Gee Bee Sportster Model D
Jones S-125
Ryan ST
Stearman-Hammond Y-1
VEF I-17
Willoughby Delta 8

Specifications (Menasco C4S Pirate)

See also

References

External links

 TC67.pdf
 www.bombercommandmuseum.ca
 www.aircraft-manuals.com
 www.oldengine.org

Air-cooled aircraft piston engines
1930s aircraft piston engines
Inverted aircraft piston engines
Pirate